Peter Brotherhood (1838–1902) was a British engineer. He invented the Brotherhood engine used for torpedoes as well as many other engineering products.

With his son he built a large engineering business in London bearing his name, Peter Brotherhood. His son Stanley moved the works to Peterborough in 1903 where their engineering business continued to grow.

On 30 October 2015 Hayward Tyler Group PLC completed the acquisition of the trade and assets of the Peter Brotherhood business from Dresser-Rand Company Ltd, a Siemens-owned company.

Family of engineers
Peter was the second son of the fourteen children of Rowland Brotherhood (1812-1883), a British engineer, and his wife Priscilla Penton. He was born in Maidenhead, Berkshire 22 April 1838 and raised in comfortable circumstances in Chippenham, Wiltshire near his father's engineering works. He spent the years when he was aged 13 to 18 studying applied science at King's College School. After practical experience including a period at the Great Western Railway works at Swindon he joined the leading marine engineering works, Maudslay, Son & Field in Lambeth in their drawing-office.

He is said to have had a "mechanical instinct" which allowed him to design machinery without resorting to calculations or formulae. He also had a passion for experiment.

Peter married Eliza Pinniger Hunt, daughter of James Edward Hunt a contractor to the Indian Railways, on 19 April 1866 and they had five children but only Stanley (1880-1938) and two daughters outlived them. Peter died at his home 15 Hyde Park Gardens on 13 October 1902.

Engineering firms

Kittoe & Brotherhood
In 1867 before he had reached the age of 30 Peter became a partner in the engineers and millwrights business of Kittoe and Brotherhood in Clerkenwell when their main product was brewing machinery. A restored Kittoe and Brotherhood beam engine of 1867 can be seen at the Coldharbour Mill museum in Devon - it was originally supplied to the Whitechapel Albion brewery.

Kittoe retired in 1871 and the firm became Peter Brotherhood.

Peter Brotherhood
Brotherhood radial engine 
After Kittoe's retirement this firm mainly produced machines of Peter Brotherhood's own invention, in particular from 1872 the Brotherhood 3-cylinder 120 degrees radial engine which could be powered by steam, water or compressed air at high speed and in perfect balance. Put to many uses it drove the Navy's Whitehead torpedoes and was used in the torpedoes of other navies as well. Fans, dynamos and other high speed machines were directly driven by this engine.

In 1881 the business was moved to Belvedere Road, Lambeth.

Products 1
The radial engine led not only to fans dynamos etc. but eventually to the manufacture of steam turbines, internal combustion engines and heavy oil and Diesel engines specially the Brotherhood-Ricardo high-speed heavy oil engine.

Stanley Brotherhood
In 1903 Peter's only surviving son, Stanley (1880–1938), previously general manager for his father, moved the works from the Lambeth premises taken in 1881 to Peterborough where it continues as Peter Brotherhood Limited.

Motor industry

Peter Brotherhood Limited made cars in Lambeth then, unable to get consent for a car factory in Peterborough, moved their manufacture to Tinsley in Yorkshire before they withdrew from that venture in 1906. They continued to make heavy agricultural tractors. From late 1906 the cars were named Sheffield-Simplex. Brotherhood's backer Fitzwilliam of Milton near Peterborough and Wentworth Woodhouse near Tinsley took over the car business naming it for Sheffield the nearby town and the operational simplicity of his very expensive cars.

Stanley Brotherhood was a director then chairman of Humber Limited until it merged with Hillman Motor Company and came under the control of Rootes Group in 1929.

Peter Brotherhood Limited
A private limited liability company was incorporated to own the Peter Brotherhood business on  16 December 1907.  In 1920 it joined the engineering combine Agricultural & General Engineers or AGE however AGE sold its 70 per cent share of Peter Brotherhood in late 1930 before AGE collapsed in 1932. On 29 June 1937 Peter Brotherhood became a public company  and was listed on the London Stock Exchange a few days later.
Products 2
In June 1937 Peter Brotherhood's products included: high and low pressure compressors, compressors for torpedo service, torpedo tubes, Brotherhood high speed forced lubrication steam engines, steam turbines, turbo-generators, high speed diesel engines, oil and gas engines, refrigerating compressors, pumps, water cooling towers, filtering plants, fans, dynamometers, pressure gauge testing and other precision instruments.

Before the company went public in 1937 contracts had been undertaken for more than 60 years for H M Government and numerous Dominion and foreign governments and many of the principal industrial, shipping, and utility enterprises in and beyond the United Kingdom including: London County Council, Metropolitan Water Board, Gas Light and Coke Co, Imperial Chemical Industries, Union Cold Storage, Burmah Oil, Anglo-Iranian Oil, LNER railway, LMS railway, P & O.

Dresser Rand Company Ltd
In 2008, the business was sold to Dresser-Rand Company Ltd.

Hayward Tyler Group
On 30 October 2015 the Hayward Tyler Group PLC completed the acquisition of the trade and assets of the Peter Brotherhood business from Dresser-Rand Company Ltd, a Siemens-owned company. The Peter Brotherhood business continues manufacturing steam turbines, gas compressors, and combined heat and power solutions.

References

External links

 Peter Brotherhood Limited
 Coldharbour Mill Steam Group page on the restoration of the Kittoe and Brotherhood beam engine
 Video - Peter Brotherhood gets the name back on the door as it is bought by the Hayward Tyler Group in 2015
 A Peter Brotherhood engine video

1838 births
1902 deaths
19th-century British engineers
English engineers